WRIA may refer to:

 WRIA-LP, a defunct low-power FM radio station (95.7 MHz) licensed to serve Jacksonville, Florida, United States
 WHPI, an FM radio station (96.5 MHz) licensed to serve Farmington, Illinois, United States, which held the call sign WRIA from 2006 to 2007